Puppy is the debut album of J-Pop idol duo, YuiKaori. It was released on 21 September 2011.

It is composed with songs from games, anime, and insert songs, but it is also contains original songs. Many songs have been released as singles.

Song information 
 "Our Steady Boy" was used as the 1st ending theme to the 2010 anime television series Kissxsis.
 "Futari/Vivivid Party!" was released as a double-single, while "Futari" used as the second ending theme to the 2010 anime television series Kissxsis.
 "Shooting Smile" was used as the opening theme to the 2011 Game Toy Wars.

Track listing

Charts

References
 初回限定盤
 通常盤

2011 debut albums